The sport of football in the country of Zambia is run by the Football Association of Zambia. The association administers the national male and female teams, as well as the Premier League, and the Women Super Division. 1993 Zambia national football team air disaster is considered one of the most signification moments in Zambian football.

History
Zambia established their national team and the governing board Football Association of Zambia in 1929. Kenneth Kaunda was instrumental in further developing the sport and encouraging further investment in developing better football infrastructure.

National team

The national team has expericed success also they were once holders of the Africa Cup of Nations, winning in the 2012 final against Ivory Coast. 

Godfrey Chitalu has been described as "the greatest Zambian player ever".

Women's national team

The women's national team qualified for their first world cup at the 2023 FIFA Women's World Cup, by reaching the semi finals of 2022 Women's Africa Cup of Nations.

References